Narec, since 2014 known as the National Renewable Energy Centre, is a part of the Offshore Renewable Energy (ORE) Catapult, a British technology innovation and research centre for offshore wind power, wave energy, tidal energy and low carbon technologies. ORE Catapult's head office is in Glasgow, Scotland. The centre operates multi-purpose offshore renewable energy test and demonstration facilities. The National Renewable Energy Centre is based in Blyth, Northumberland.

History

Originally known as NaREC (New and Renewable Energy Centre), the centre was created in 2002 by One NorthEast, the North East regional development agency, as part of the Strategy for Success programme. In 2010 the organisation changed its name to Narec (National Renewable Energy Centre). In April 2014, the organisation merged with the Offshore Renewable Energy (ORE) Catapult to focus on the development and cost reduction of offshore wind, wave and tidal energy across the UK.

The organisation was originally involved in a wide range of technologies, including:
 Wind (onshore and offshore)
 Transmission and distribution
 Photovoltaics
 Oil and gas
 Marine renewables
 Fuel cells
 Microrenewables
 Biomass

In 2010, due to UK government cutbacks, Narec closed, sold off or separated parts of the business. Spin-off companies include:

Decerna – Working on energy efficiency, solar farm design, preparation of MW-scale battery sites, grid connection, and life-cycle assessment. The company was renamed from Narec Distributed Energy Limited in 2022.

Solar Capture Technologies – Specialises on bespoke and novel solar photovoltaic systems, including off-grid systems. Renamed from Narec Solar in 2013.

Narec Capital – A financial organisation run by Narec and Ashberg Limited.

Renewable Risk Advisers Limited – renamed from Narec Capital Risk Solutions Limited in 2012.

Following its merger with ORE Catapult, the National Renewable Energy Centre now focuses on helping to de-risk and accelerate the development and commercialisation of the offshore renewable energy industry in the UK. Narec Limited was dissolved in 2017.

Operations

The National Renewable Energy Centre is involved in:

Wind turbine rotor blades 

Product certification, verification and investigations for the next generation offshore wind turbines.

Power trains and components 

3MW and 15MW facilities that can perform independent performance and reliability assessments of full systems and components.

Electrical networks

UKAS accredited laboratories with specialist test and measurement facilities to help develop technologies needed for developing power systems and exploring life extension opportunities for ageing assets.

Subsea trials and demonstrations 

Controlled onshore salt water location for all stages of technology development.

Resource measurement and assessment

Open access facility for testing, calibrating and verifying remote sensor technologies

Closed facilities

Clothier High Voltage Laboratory

The Clothier Electrical Testing Laboratory was opened in 1970 by A. Reyrolle & Company. Narec took over the facility in 2004, to use it to test the robustness of electrical infrastructure offshore locations to onshore sites.

Although one of the few high voltage testing facilities in the world, the facility was closed by Narec in 2011 due to a lack of government funding. Many parts of the lab were relocated to Narec's main campus in Blyth. The ruins of the original lab are now the property of Siemens.

Current facilities

Charles Parsons Technology Centre

Built in 2004, this £5m facility contains a low voltage electrical laboratory for the testing of connecting renewable energy systems to the transmission and distribution grid. Some of the equipment and staff from the closed Narec Clothier Electrical Testing Laboratory were moved to this facility.

Training tower

This is a 27m high tower, for training of offshore wind technicians.

Dry docks

Tests marine devices with three modified dry docks.

Power train test facilities – 3MW and 15MW 

Facilities that can perform independent performance and reliability assessments of full systems and components.

Blade test 1 & 2

The blade testing facilities at National Renewable Energy Centre are designed to test wind turbine blades up to 100m in length. Blades are tested using a Compact Resonant Mass (CRM) system. ORE Catapult is working on a technique of blade testing known as "Dual Axis".

European funded research

ORE Catapult is involved in a number of European funded research projects including Tidal EC, Optimus and LIFES50+.

Conferences and papers
Narec staff have written papers which have appeared in journals and international energy conferences. These are mainly in the subjects of photovoltaics, wind, marine, and electrical infrastructure. A short list of some of these is given below:
Snapper, An efficient and compact direct electric power take-off device for wave energy converters.
Availability and Estimation of Marine Renewable Energy Resources
Marine Renewables: A Development Route Map for the UK
Bivariate empirical mode decomposition and its contribution to wind turbine condition monitoring
Experimental tests of an air-cored PM tubular generator for direct drive wave energy converters
Fatigue testing of wind turbine blades with computational verification.
Ensuring Reliability for Offshore Wind – Large Testing Facilities.
Accelerating Technology Development for Round 3 Offshore Deployment.
Electrical Network Testing & Simulation: An effective method of testing the fault ride through capabilities of Small Scale Distributed Generation
Ensuring Reliability for Marine Renewable Drive Train Systems – Nautilus Testing Facilities
LGBC Silicon Solar Cell with modified bus bar suitable for high volume wire bonding
Process and device modelling for enhancement of silicon solar cell efficiency
An intelligent approach to the condition monitoring of large scale wind turbines
Lightning Arresters and Substation Protection
Study on laser parameters for silicon solar cells with LCP selective emitters
Low Cost, 100X point focus silicon concentrator cells made by the LGBC process
Laser Grooved Buried Contact Concentrator Solar Cells
Studying the Groove Profiles Produced for Fine Line Screen Printed Front Contacts in Laser Grooved Buried Contact Solar Cells.
Investigation of cross wafer uniformity of production line produced LGBC concentrator solar cells
Process Development of Coloured LGBC Solar Cells for BIPV Applications
Process optimisation for coloured laser grooved buried contact solar cells
Colour and Shape in Laser Grooved Buried Contact Solar Cells for Applications in the Built Environment
Fine-Line Screen Printing in Large Area Laser Grooved, Buried Contact Silicon Solar Cells
Progress of the LAB2LINE Laser Grooved Buried Contact Screen Printed Solar Cells Hybrid p-type Monocrystalline Process
Development of Laser Fired Contact (LFC) Rear Passivated Laser Groove Buried Contact (LGBC) Solar Cells Using Thin Wafers
The LAB2LINE laser grooved buried contact screen printed solar cells hybrid p-type monocrystaline process
Integrated process and device 'TCAD' for enhancement of C-Si solar cell efficiency
Screen printing in laser grooved buried contact solar cells: The LAB2LINE hybrid processes
Surface passivation by silicon nitride in Laser Grooved Buried Contact (LGBC) silicon solar cells
Optimisation of the front contact for low to medium concentrations in LGBC silicon solar cells
Laser Grooved Buried Contact Solar Cells for Concentration Factors up to 100X
Device Design and Process Optimisation for LGBC Solar Cells for Use Between 50X and 100X Concentration
Design and Optimisation of Laser Grooved Buried Contact Solar Cells for Use At Concentration Factors Up To 100X
Development of Laser Grooved Buried Contact Solar Cells for Use at Concentration Factors up to 100X
Front contact modelling of monocrystaline silicon laser grooved buried contact solar cells
Laser Grooved Buried Contact Concentrator Cells
PC1D modelling of the efficiency of laser grooved buried contact solar cells designed for use at concentration factors up to 100X
Front Dicing Technique for Pre-isolation of Concentrator Silicon Solar Cells
Environmental sustainability of concentrator PV systems: Preliminary LCA results of the APOLLON project
Process development of shape and colour in LGBC solar cells for BIPV applications
A summary of the Havemor project – Process development of shaped and coloured solar cells for BIPV applications
Process and device modelling for enhancement of silicon solar cell efficiency
Technological and Financial Aspects of Laser Grooved Buried Contact Silicon Solar Cell Based Concentrator Systems
First results on the APOLLON project multi-approach for high efficiency integrated and intelligent concentrating PV modules (systems)

References

External links
ORE Catapult

Blyth, Northumberland
Renewable energy organizations
Energy research institutes
Engineering companies of England
Renewable energy in England
Companies based in Northumberland
2002 establishments in England
Companies established in 2002
Non-profit organisations based in England
Catapult centres
Science and technology in Northumberland